Sleeze Beez are a glam metal band formed in 1987 in the Netherlands.

They released four studio albums and one live album over a nine-year career before disbanding in 1996. Their 1989 album Screwed Blued & Tattooed peaked at number 115 on the Billboard 200 album chart.
The song "Stranger Than Paradise" was a big hit on MTV and was taken from the Screwed Blued & Tattooed album. In 1992 after a long tour they released the album "Powertool" by Atlantic Records, which contains the ballad "I Don't Want to Live Without You" and was a minor hit.

Sleeze Beez was formed by drummer Jan Koster and guitarist Chriz van Jaarsveld in 1987. The first recordings were made with the Belgian singer Tigo 'Tiger' Fawzi, for the album Look Like Hell. He was briefly  followed by Thijs Hamelaers. 

In 1989 the Beez got more stability by recruiting the English vocalist Andrew Elt, who previously sang in Gin On The Rocks. They cut the successful Screwed Blued & Tattooed LP which broke them in the US, and they took up as opening act for Skid Row. On the strength of the hit single "Stranger Than Paradise", the band then did  90 headline shows throughout the US and Canada. 

In the early nineties momentum slowed for the band, which increasingly found that the musical tide had turned, and there was less demand for glam metal bands.  Meanwhile, popularity overseas particularly in Japan remained strong and the band toured there in 1995. A live album was released that same year.

In 1996, Koster, who for years had struggled  with a wrist injury announced that he could not continue. At this point the band fell apart. In later years  Koster with Van Jaarsveld and Jongsma formed the band Jetland, which focused mainly on punk rock and landed in the Dutch Top 40 with the single "And The Crowd Goes". Andrew Elt and Don van Spall played  in The Heavy 70's cover band, and The Moon, a band with original material.

They reformed in 2010. The band supported Aerosmith alongside Stone Temple Pilots on June 23, 2010 at the GelreDome in Arnhem and announced a headlining appearance on February 4, 2011 at the Paradiso in Amsterdam.

Current members

Andrew Elt - vocals, guitar, harmonica (1988-1996, 2010–present)
Chriz Van Jaarsveld - guitar, backing vocals (1987-1996, 2010–present)
Don Van Spall - guitar, backing vocals (1987-1996, 2010–present)
Ed Jongsma - bass guitar, backing vocals (1987-1996, 2010–present)
Jan Koster - drums, backing vocals (1987-1996, 2010–present)

Past members
Tigo "Tiger" Fawzi - vocals (1987-1988)
Thijs Hamelaers - vocals (1988)

Discography

Studio albums
 Look Like Hell - 1987
 Screwed Blued & Tattooed (US No. 115) - 1990
 Powertool - 1992
 Insanity Beach - 1994

Live albums
 Live in Tokyo - 1995 
 Screwed Live! - 2010

Compilation albums
 The Very Best of Sleeze Beez - 2010

Singles
 Stranger Than Paradise (US No. 21 Album Rock Tracks) - 1990 
 Scream - 1994
 Gun Culture - 1994
 Hate Rock and Roll - 1994

References

External links
Sleeze Beez official site 
Sleeze Beez Myspace 
Sleaze Roxx Profile 

Dutch glam metal musical groups
Musical groups established in 1987